Events from the year 1901 in Denmark.

Incumbents
 Monarch – Christian IX
 Prime minister – Hannibal Sehested (until 24 May), Johan Henrik Deuntzer

Events
 3 April – The 1901 Folketing election is held. It was the first use of a secret ballot in Denmark.
 24 June – The Frilandsmuseet  open-air museum is inaugurated in its present-day location north of Copenhagen.
 24 July – Systemskiftet ("the change of system"): with the appointment of the Cabinet of Deuntzer, parliamentarism is instituted in Denmark, and with the exception of the Easter Crisis of 1920 no Danish government since 1901 has been formed against the vote of a majority of the members of the Folketing.
 30 August – A royal decrete opens the King's Gate to Rosenborg Castle Garden, at the corner of Gothersgade and Kronprinsessegade, to the public.
 25 September – The Ny Carlsberg Foundation is established.
 28 November – Øksnehallen opens in the Meatpacking District in Copenhagen.

Undated
 The first automobile is registered in Copenhagen.
 The first kindergarten with public support in Denmark is established and inaugurated at Enghave Plads in the Vesterbro district of Copenhagen. Private kindergartens had been known since 1871.

Culture

Music
 4 October  Carl Nielsen's String Quartet No. 3 is for the first time performed in public in the small hall of the Odd Fellows Mansion in Copenhagen.

Sports
 28 March  Skive IK is founded.
 14 July  Thorvald Ellegaard wins gold in men's sprint at the 1901 UCI Track Cycling World Championships.

Births
 20 February – Mogens Lassen, architect (died 1987)
 9 July – Peter Sekaer, photographer (died 1950)
 25 August – Kjeld Abell, playwright (died 1961)

Deaths
 19 January – Henrik August Flindt, landscape architect (born 1822)
 6 February –  Christian Frederik Lütken, zoologist ad naturalist (born 1827)
 19 October – Carl Frederik Tietgen, industrialist and bankier (born 1829)
 31 October – Frederik Christian Lund, painter and illustrator (born 1826)
 16 November – Theobald Stein, sculptor (born 1829)
 29 November – Ludvig Grundtvig, photographer (born 1836)

References

 
Denmark
Years of the 20th century in Denmark
1900s in Denmark
Denmark